Hillcrest may refer to:

Places

Australia
Hillcrest, Queensland, a suburb of Logan City
Hillcrest, South Australia, suburb of Adelaide
Hillcrest, Tasmania, suburb of Burnie

Canada
Hillcrest, Alberta, also known as Hillcrest Mines
Hillcrest, Norfolk County, Ontario, an unincorporated community
Hillcrest, Prince Edward County, Ontario, an unincorporated community
Hillcrest, Toronto, Ontario, a neighbourhood

Ireland

 Hillcrest, Lucan Housing estate in Lucan, Co. Dublin

Malaysia
Sekolah Menengah Kebangsaan Hillcrest, Batu Caves, Malaysia
Hillcrest Residence, Penang
Hillcrest Gardens, Puchong

New Zealand
Hillcrest, Auckland, a suburb of Auckland
Hillcrest, Waikato, a suburb of Hamilton

South Africa
Hillcrest, KwaZulu-Natal, a suburb of eThekwini in KwaZulu-Natal
Hillcrest, Pretoria, a suburb of Pretoria

United States
(by state then city)
Hillcrest, Little Rock, Arkansas, a neighborhood in Little Rock
Hillcrest, California (disambiguation)
Hillcrest, Los Angeles County, California
Hillcrest, San Diego, California, a neighborhood
Hillcrest, Shasta County, California
Hillcrest Heights, Florida, a town in the United States 
Hillcrest (Cochran, Georgia), listed on the National Register of Historic Places (NRHP) in Georgia
Hillcrest, Illinois, a village
Hillcrest, Indiana, an unincorporated community
Hillcrest (Anchorage, Kentucky), listed on the NRHP in Kentucky
Hillcrest Heights, Maryland, a place in the United States
Hillcrest, Michigan, an unincorporated community
Hillcrest, Paterson, New Jersey, a neighborhood
Hillcrest, Trenton, New Jersey, a neighborhood
Hillcrest (Cazenovia, New York), listed on the NRHP in New York
Hillcrest, Broome County, New York
Hillcrest, Rockland County, New York
Hillcrest (Lima, New York), listed on the NRHP in New York
Hillcrest, Queens, New York, a neighborhood in New York City
Hillcrest, Rockland County, New York, a hamlet
Hillcrest Apartments, public housing in Asheville, NC
Hillcrest, Ohio, an unincorporated community
Hillcrest, Texas, a village
Hillcrest, Virginia, an unincorporated community
Hillcrest, Washington, D.C., a neighborhood in southeast Washington, D.C.
Hillcrest, West Virginia
Hillcrest, Wisconsin, an unincorporated community

Zimbabwe
 Hillcrest, Bulawayo, a suburb of Bulawayo

See also
 Hillcrest, a rock band from New Britain, CT
Hillcrest School (disambiguation)
Hillcrest Complex, the Toronto Transit Commission's largest facility
Hillcrest Country Club (disambiguation), several places
Hillcrest Honors Community, a residence hall at Virginia Polytechnic Institute and State University in the United States
Hillcrest Hospital, a branch hospital of the Cleveland Clinic in Mayfield Heights, OH
Hillcrest Jewish Center Day Camp
Hillcrest Labs, the company that invented Freespace motion control technology
Hillcrest mine disaster, a coal mining accident in Canada
Hillcrest Park, in Vancouver, Canada
Hillcrest Village, in Toronto, Canada
Rosemarie Hillcrest, an English model best known as Playboy's Miss October 1964
UC San Diego Medical Center, Hillcrest, a hospital in San Diego, California